The Carolina Panthers are a professional American football team based in Charlotte, North Carolina. The Panthers compete in the National Football League (NFL), as a member club of the league's National Football Conference (NFC) South division. The team is headquartered in Bank of America Stadium in Uptown Charlotte; the stadium also serves as the team's home field. The Panthers are supported throughout the Carolinas; although the team has played its home games in Charlotte since 1996, it played its home games at Memorial Stadium in Clemson, South Carolina during its first season in 1995. The team hosts its annual training camp at Wofford College in Spartanburg, South Carolina. Along with the New England Patriots, it is one of only two teams whose name represents multiple states.

The Panthers were announced as the league's 29th franchise in 1993 and began playing in 1995 under the original owner and founder Jerry Richardson. The Panthers played well in their first two years, finishing  in 1995 (an all-time best for an NFL expansion team's first season) and 12–4 the following year, winning the NFC West before ultimately losing to the eventual Super Bowl champion Green Bay Packers in the NFC Championship Game. They did not have another winning season until 2003 when they won the NFC Championship Game and reached Super Bowl XXXVIII, losing 32–29 to the New England Patriots. After recording playoff appearances in 2005 and 2008, the team failed to record another playoff appearance until 2013, the first of three consecutive NFC South titles. After losing in the divisional round to the San Francisco 49ers in 2013 and the Seattle Seahawks in 2014, the Panthers returned to the Super Bowl in 2016 but lost to the Denver Broncos. Since then, the team has appeared in the playoffs only once, in 2017. The team's five NFC South titles since the division's establishment in 2002 rank second only to the New Orleans Saints.

As of 2022, the Carolina Panthers remain the newest club in the NFC. The franchise is legally registered as Panther Football, LLC. and are controlled by David Tepper, whose purchase of the team from founder Jerry Richardson was unanimously approved by league owners on May 22, 2018. The club is worth approximately US$2.3 billion, according to Forbes.

Franchise history

Beginnings
On December 15, 1987, entrepreneur Jerry Richardson announced his bid for an NFL expansion franchise in the Carolinas. A North Carolina native, Richardson was a former wide receiver on the Baltimore Colts who had used his 1959 league championship bonus to co-found the Hardee's restaurant chain, later becoming president and CEO of TW Services. Richardson drew his inspiration to pursue an NFL franchise from George Shinn, who had made a successful bid for an expansion National Basketball Association (NBA) team in Charlotte, the Charlotte Hornets. Richardson founded Richardson Sports, a partnership consisting of himself, his family, and a number of businessmen from North and South Carolina who were also recruited to be limited partners. Richardson looked at four potential locations for a stadium, ultimately choosing uptown Charlotte.

To highlight the demand for professional football in the Carolinas, Richardson Sports held preseason games around the area from 1989 to 1991. The first two games were held at Carter–Finley Stadium in Raleigh, North Carolina, and Kenan Memorial Stadium in Chapel Hill, North Carolina, while the third and final game was held at Williams-Brice Stadium in Columbia, South Carolina. The matchups were between existing NFL teams. In 1991, the group formally filed an application for the open expansion spot, and on October 26, 1993, the 28 NFL owners unanimously named the Carolina Panthers as the 29th member of the NFL.

Jerry Richardson era (1995–2017)

The Panthers first competed in the 1995 NFL season; they were one of two expansion teams to begin playing that year, the other being the Jacksonville Jaguars. The Panthers were put in the NFC West to increase the size of that division to five teams; there were already two other southeastern teams in the division, the Atlanta Falcons and the New Orleans Saints. Former Pittsburgh Steelers defensive coordinator Dom Capers was named the first head coach. The team finished its inaugural season , the best performance ever from a first-year expansion team. They performed even better in their second season, finishing with a  record and winning the NFC West division, as well as securing a first-round bye. The Panthers beat the defending Super Bowl champions Dallas Cowboys in the divisional round before losing the NFC Championship Game to the eventual Super Bowl champions, the Green Bay Packers.

The Panthers hired former San Francisco 49ers head coach George Seifert to replace Capers, and he led the team to an  record in 1999. This performance tied the NFL record for most losses in a single season, and it broke the record held by the winless 1976 Buccaneers for most consecutive losses in a single season (both records have since been broken by the 2008 Lions), leading the Panthers to fire Seifert.

John Fox years (2002–2010) 

After the NFL's expansion to 32 teams in 2002, the Panthers were relocated from the NFC West to the newly created NFC South division. The Panthers' rivalries with the Falcons and Saints were maintained, and they would be joined by the Tampa Bay Buccaneers. New York Giants defensive coordinator John Fox was hired to replace Seifert and led the team to a  finish in 2002. Although the team's defense gave up very few yards, ranking the second-best in the NFL in yards conceded, they were hindered by an offense that ranked as the second-worst in the league in yards gained. 

King felt the game "was a wonderful championship battle, full of everything that makes football dramatic, draining, enervating, maddening, fantastic, exciting" and praised, among other things, the unpredictability, coaching, and conclusion. The game is still viewed as one of the best Super Bowls of all time, and in the opinion of Charlotte-based NPR reporter Scott Jagow, the Panthers' Super Bowl appearance represented the arrival of Charlotte onto the national scene.

Following a  start in 2004, the Panthers rebounded to win six of their last seven games despite losing 14 players for the season due to injury. Had they won the game, the Panthers would have made the playoffs. In the first round of the playoffs, the Panthers went on the road to face the New York Giants, beating them 23–0 for the NFL's first playoff shutout against a home team since 1980. The following week, they beat Chicago 29–21 on the road, but lost key players Julius Peppers, a defensive end, and DeShaun Foster, a running back, who were both injured during the game. The Panthers were then defeated 34–14 by the Seattle Seahawks in the NFC Championship Game, ending their season. Although the Panthers went into the 2006 season as favorites to win the NFC South and the free agent signing of Keyshawn Johnson, they finished with a disappointing  record. The team finished the 2007 season with a  record after losing quarterback Jake Delhomme early in the season due to an elbow injury. 

In 2008, the Panthers rebounded with a  regular season record, winning the NFC South and securing a first-round bye. They were eliminated in the divisional round of the playoffs, losing 33–13 to the eventual NFC Champion Arizona Cardinals after Delhomme turned the ball over six times. Delhomme's struggles carried over into the 2009 season, where he threw 18 interceptions in the first 11 games before breaking a finger in his throwing hand. The Panthers were at a  record before Delhomme's season-ending injury, and his backup, Matt Moore, led the team to a  finish to the season for an  overall record. In 2010, after releasing Delhomme in the offseason, the Panthers finished with a league-worst record; their offense was the worst in the league. John Fox's contract expired after the season ended, and the team did not retain him or his staff.

Ron Rivera years (2011–2019) 

The team hired Ron Rivera to replace Fox as head coach and drafted Auburn's Heisman Trophy-winning quarterback Cam Newton with the first overall pick in the 2011 NFL Draft. The Panthers opened the 2011 season , but finished with a  record, and Newton was awarded the AP Offensive Rookie of the Year award after setting the NFL record for most rushing touchdowns from a quarterback (14) in a single season and becoming the first rookie NFL quarterback to throw for over 4,000 yards in a single season. He also was the first rookie quarterback to rush for over 500 yards in a single season. After strengthening the defense with future all-pro Luke Kuechly in the 2012 draft, the Panthers again opened the 2012 season poorly, losing five out of their first six games, leading longtime general manager Marty Hurney to be fired in response. The team slid to a  record before winning five of their last six games, resulting in a  record. This strong finish helped save Rivera's job. The Panthers had a winning season the following year, finishing with a  record and winning their third NFC South title and another playoff bye, but they were beaten by the 49ers in the Divisional Round. In 2014, the Panthers opened the season with two wins, but after 12 games, sat at  due in part to a seven-game winless streak. The Panthers defeated the Arizona Cardinals, 27–16, in the wild card round to advance to the divisional playoffs, where they lost to eventual NFC champion Seattle, 31–17. The 2015 season saw the Panthers start the season  and finish the season , which tied for the best regular-season record in NFC history. During the same season, Cam Newton was named NFL MVP. The Panthers also secured their third consecutive NFC South championship, as well as their first overall top-seeded playoff berth. In the 2015–16 playoffs, the Panthers defeated the Seattle Seahawks in the NFC Divisional playoffs, 31–24, after shutting them out in the first half, 31–0, and the Arizona Cardinals, 49–15, in the NFC Championship Game to advance to Super Bowl 50, their first Super Bowl appearance since the 2003 season. The Panthers lost a defensive struggle to the AFC champion Denver Broncos, 24–10.In the 2016 season, the Panthers regressed on their 15–1 record from 2015, posting a 6–10 record and a last-place finish in the NFC South, missing the playoffs for the first time since 2012, and losing the division title to the second-seeded Falcons, who went on to represent the NFC in Super Bowl LI. In 2017, the Panthers finished with an 11–5 record and a #5 seed. However, they lost to the New Orleans Saints 31–26 in the Wild Card Round, their first loss in that round in franchise history.

David Tepper era (2018–present)

On May 16, 2018, David Tepper, formerly a minority owner of the Pittsburgh Steelers, finalized an agreement to purchase the Panthers. The sale price was nearly $2.3 billion, a record. The agreement was approved by the league owners on May 22, 2018. The sale officially closed on July 9, 2018. After starting 6–2, the Panthers finished the 2018 season 7–9. They began the 2019 season 5–3 but lost the last eight games to finish 5–11; late in the season, Tepper fired Rivera as head coach. Perry Fewell finished the season as interim coach, going 0–4.

Matt Rhule years (2020–2022)
 
On January 7, 2020, the Panthers hired Baylor head coach Matt Rhule as head coach. On January 15, 2020, Luke Kuechly announced his retirement from the league. On March 17, 2020, The Panthers signed Teddy Bridgewater to a three-year $63 million contract. On March 24, the Carolina Panthers released their 2011 1st overall pick and 2015 MVP quarterback Cam Newton. The Panthers had a difficult 2020 season, losing several close games. They would finish 5–11 for the second straight year.

Following the season, the Panthers traded for Sam Darnold from the New York Jets and shipped Bridgewater to the Denver Broncos. On November 11, 2021, the Panthers signed Cam Newton to a one-year deal after Darnold was put on injured reserve. However, the Panthers' struggles continued; despite winning their first three games of the 2021 season, they finished 5–12 and ended the season on a seven-game losing streak.

After the Panthers began the season with a 1–4 record, Rhule was fired as head coach on October 10, 2022, finishing his tenure with an 11–27 record in two and a half seasons. Steve Wilks was named interim head coach as a result. The Panthers then initiated a rebuild, trading players such as Robbie Anderson and Christian McCaffrey. Steve Wilks would go 6-6 as the interim head coach, as the Panthers would finish the season with a 7-10 record.

Frank Reich years (2023)
On January 26, 2023, former Indianapolis Colts head coach Frank Reich was hired as head coach. Reich was previously the first starting QB in Panthers history in 1995.

Logo and uniforms

Logo
The shape of the Panthers logo was designed to mimic the outline of both North Carolina and South Carolina. The Panthers changed their logo and logotype in 2012, the first such change in team history. According to the team, the changes were designed to give their logo an "aggressive, contemporary look" as well as to give it a more three-dimensional feel. The primary tweaks were made in the eye and mouth, where the features, particularly the muscular brow and fangs, are more pronounced, creating a more menacing look. The revised logo has a darker shade of blue over the black logo, compared to the old design, which had a shade similar to teal on top of black.

Uniforms
By the time they had been announced as the 29th NFL team in October 1993, the Panthers' logo and helmet design had already been finalized, but the uniform design was still under creation. After discussion, the Panthers organization decided on jerseys colored white, black, and blue and pants colored white and silver. The exact tone of blue, which they decided would be "process blue" (a shade lighter than Duke's and darker than North Carolina's), was the most difficult color to choose.

The team's uniform has remained largely the same since its creation, with only minor alterations, such as changing the sock color of the team's black uniforms from blue to black and changing the team's shoes from white to black. Richardson, a self-described traditionalist, said that no major uniform changes would be made in his lifetime.

The Panthers have three main jersey colors: black, white, and blue. Their blue jerseys, designated their alternate uniforms, are the newest and were introduced in 2002. NFL regulations allow the team to use the blue jersey up to two times in any given season. In all other games, the team must wear either their white or black jerseys; in NFL games, the home team decides whether to wear a dark or white jersey, while the away team wears the opposite. Usually the Panthers opt for white or blue when the weather is expected to be hot and for black when the weather is expected to be cold.

The Panthers typically pair their white jerseys with white pants and blue socks, while the black and blue jerseys are paired with silver pants and black socks; there have only been a few exceptions to these combinations.
The first such instance was in 1998 when the team paired their white jerseys with silver pants in a game against the Indianapolis Colts. The second instance was in 2012 during a game against the Denver Broncos when they paired their black jerseys with new black pants; this created an all-black uniform, with the exception of blue socks and silver helmets. The decision to wear blue socks was made by team captain Steve Smith, who felt the blue socks gave the uniforms a more distinct appearance compared with other teams that have all-black uniforms. The all-black uniforms won the "Greatest Uniform in NFL History" contest, a fan-voted contest run by NFL.com in July 2013. In July 2013, the team's equipment manager, Jackie Miles, said the Panthers intended to use the all-black uniform more in the future. The Panthers wore the all-black uniform three times the following season, once each in the preseason and regular season, and the third time during the home divisional round playoff game vs the 49ers. During the Panthers' 2015 Thanksgiving Day game against the Dallas Cowboys, they debuted an all-blue uniform as part of Nike's "Color Rush" series.

The 2018 season saw the Panthers debut the following new combinations:
blue jerseys, white pants, and blue socks (Preseason Week 2 vs. the Dolphins)
blue jerseys, black pants, and blue socks (Preseason Week 3 vs. the Patriots)
white jerseys, black pants, and blue socks (Preseason Week 4 vs. the Steelers)
white jerseys, white pants, and black socks (Week 1 vs. the Cowboys)
white jerseys, black pants, and black socks (Week 7 vs. the Eagles)
black jerseys, black pants, and black socks (Week 11 vs. the Lions)

The team's uniform did not change significantly after Nike became the NFL's jersey supplier in 2012, but the collar was altered to honor former Panthers player and coach Sam Mills by featuring the phrase "Keep Pounding". Nike had conceived the idea, and the team supported the concept as a way to expose newer fans to the legacy of Mills, who died of cancer in 2005. Mills had introduced the phrase, which has since become a team slogan, in a speech that he gave to the players and coaches prior to their 2003 playoff game against Dallas; in the speech, Mills compared his fight against cancer with the team's on-field battle, saying "When I found out I had cancer, there were two things I could do – quit or keep pounding. I'm a fighter. I kept pounding. You're fighters, too. Keep pounding!"

In 2019, the Panthers unveiled new uniforms. The new uniforms are Nike's "Vapor Untouchable" and have only minor differences: the tapered strips on the pants are replaced by stripes that extend down to the socks, the reflective shoulder cloth was replaced and the hip logos were also removed. The uniforms keep the same basic look, colors, and numbers as the originals. As the 2019 season was the team's 25th, the Panthers sported a 25th-anniversary patch on their uniforms. In the 2019 season, the Panthers continued to use the new pant-jersey color combinations from 2018 while bringing back the silver pants with their black jerseys.

In Week 9 of the 2021 season, the Panthers wore black jerseys with white pants for the first time in a home game against the Patriots. Then in Week 17 against the Saints, the Panthers wore an all-white set (white jerseys, white pants, and white socks) for the first time.

Starting in 2022, the Panthers added an alternate black helmet to be paired with the all-black uniform set. In Week 7 against the Buccaneers, the Panthers added a new combination featuring white jerseys, black pants, and white socks.

Stadium and practice facilities

The Panthers played their first season at Memorial Stadium in Clemson, South Carolina, as their facility in uptown Charlotte was still under construction. Ericsson Stadium, called Bank of America Stadium since 2004, opened in the summer of 1996. The stadium was specially designed by HOK Sports Facilities Group for football and also serves as the headquarters and administrative offices of the Panthers. On some days, the stadium offers public tours for a fee. Private tours for groups are offered for a fee seven days a week, though there are some exceptions, and such tours must be arranged in advance.

Two bronze panther statues flank each of the stadium's three main entrances; they are the largest sculptures ever commissioned in the United States. The names of the team's original PSL owners are engraved on the base of each statue. The first two people in the Panthers Hall of Honor, team executive Mike McCormack and linebacker Sam Mills, are honored with life-sized bronze statues outside the stadium. Mills, in addition to being the only player in the Hall of Honor for over 20 years, is the only player to have had his jersey number (#51) retired by the Panthers .

The Panthers have three open-air fields next to Bank of America Stadium where they currently hold their practices; during the 1995 season, when the team played their home games in South Carolina, the team held their practices at Winthrop University in Rock Hill, South Carolina. Because the practice fields, along with the stadium, are located in uptown Charlotte, the fields are directly visible from skyscrapers as well as from a four-story condominium located across the street. According to Mike Cranston, a running joke said that the Panthers' division rivals had pooled their resources to purchase a room on the building's top floor and that a fire at the condominium was caused by the Panthers organization. In order to prevent people from seeing inside the field while the team is practicing, the team has added "strategically planted trees and a tarp over the ... fence surrounding the fields". Additionally, they employ a security team to watch for and chase away any people who stop alongside the fence surrounding the field. The team does not own this facility. The Panthers have hosted their annual training camp at Wofford College in Spartanburg, South Carolina, since 1995.

Team Headquarters
After six months of discussions and state approval of $115 million in incentives, the formal announcement of the team's plan for a new practice facility came on June 5, 2019. Rock Hill mayor John Gettys described the project at that time as the biggest in the city's history. Groundbreaking took place in July 2019, and it was expected to be completed by summer 2023. The agreement with Rock Hill, however, ended up being terminated on April 19, 2022, with owner David Tepper filing for Chapter 11 bankruptcy.

Culture
The Panthers are supported in both North Carolina and South Carolina; South Carolina Governor Nikki Haley declared July 30, 2012, "Carolina Panthers Day" in her state, saying that "when it comes to professional teams, the Carolina Panthers are the team that South Carolina calls their own". During the 2016 NFC Championship and Super Bowl, the hashtag #OneCarolina was used by college and professional sports teams from North Carolina and South Carolina to show unified support for the Panthers.

Pat Yasinskas of ESPN.com observed in 2012 that while there is "a bit of a wine-and-cheese atmosphere at Panthers games ... there is a strong core of die-hard fans who bring energy to Bank of America Stadium. Charlotte lives and dies with the Panthers because there aren't a lot of other options in the sports world". Sports Illustrated graded the Panthers as having the 10th highest "NFL Fan Value Experience" in 2007, attributing much of the fan atmosphere to the team's newness when compared to the established basketball fanbase. They also observed that the stadium has scattered parking lots, each of which has a different tailgating style. Some have fried chicken, pork, or Carolina-style barbecue, while others have live bands and televisions. Pickup football games in the parking lots are common.
The Carolina Panthers have sold out all home games since December 2002, and their home attendance has ranked in the NFL's top ten since 2006.

Mascot, cheerleaders, and drumline

Sir Purr, an anthropomorphic black panther who wears a jersey numbered '00', has been the Panthers' mascot since their first season. During games, Sir Purr provides sideline entertainment through skits and "silly antics". The mascot participates in a number of community events year-round, including a monthly visit to the patients at Levine Children's Hospital. Sir Purr also hosts the annual Mascot Bowl, an event which pits pro and college mascots against each other during halftime at a selected Panthers home game.

The team's cheerleaders are the Carolina Topcats who lead cheers and entertain fans at home games. The TopCats participate in both corporate and charity events. In March 2022, the Carolina Topcats became the first NFL cheerleading team to have a transgender member, Justine Lindsay. The team's drumline is PurrCussion, an ensemble of snare, tenor, and bass drummers as well as cymbal players. PurrCussion performs for fans outside the stadium and introduces players prior to home games; it consists of drummers from across the Carolinas.

Keep Pounding Drum
Starting with the 2012 season, the Panthers introduced the Keep Pounding Drum, inspired by the aforementioned motivational speech by Sam Mills before the team's 2004 playoff game against the Cowboys. Prior to each home game, an honorary drummer hits the six-foot-tall drum four times to signify the four quarters of an American football game. According to the team, the drummers "come from a variety of backgrounds and occupations, but all have overcome a great trial or adversity that has not only made them strong but also pushes them to make others around them stronger". Drummers have included current and former Panthers players, military veterans, Make-A-Wish children, and athletes from other sports, including NBA MVP and Charlotte native Stephen Curry, US women's national soccer team players Whitney Engen and Heather O'Reilly, and 7 time NASCAR Cup Series champion Jimmie Johnson.

Songs and traditions
During the inaugural season of the Panthers, the team had an official fight song, which the team played before each home game. The song, "Stand and Cheer", remains the team's official fight song, but the team does not typically play it before home games. Due to negative fan reaction "Stand and Cheer" was pulled in 1999. Since 2006, the song has returned. The team plays Neil Diamond's "Sweet Caroline" after home victories.
A "keep pounding" chant was introduced during the 2012 season which starts before the opening kickoff of each home game. As prompted by the video boards, one side of the stadium shouts "keep" and the other side replies with "pounding". The chant is similar to ones that take place at college football games.

Charity and community work
The Carolina Panthers support a variety of non-profits in North and South Carolina through the Carolina Panthers Charities. Four annual scholarships are awarded to student athletes through the Carolina Panthers Graduate Scholarship and the Carolina Panthers Players Sam Mills Memorial Scholarship programs. Carolina Panthers Charities also offers grants to non-profits that support education, athletics, and human services in the community. The Panthers and Fisher Athletic have provided six equipment grants to high school football teams in the Carolinas each year since 2010. Carolina Panthers Charities raises funds at three annual benefits: the Countdown to Kickoff Luncheon, the team's first public event each season; Football 101, an educational workshop for fans; and the Weekend Warrior Flag Football Tournament, a two-day non-contact flag football tournament. Another annual benefit is Taste of the Panthers, a gourmet food tasting which raises funds for Second Harvest Food Bank of Metrolina.

In 2003 the Panthers and Carolinas HealthCare Foundation established the Keep Pounding Fund, a fundraising initiative to support cancer research and patient support programs. The Panthers community has raised more than $1.4 million for the fund through direct donations, charity auctions, blood drives, and an annual 5k stadium run. The Panthers and Levine Children's Hospital coordinate monthly hospital visits and VIP game-day experiences for terminally ill or hospitalized children.

In addition to these team-specific efforts, the Panthers participate in a number of regular initiatives promoted by the NFL and USA Football, the league's youth football development partner. These include USA Football Month, held throughout August to encourage and promote youth football; A Crucial Catch, the league's Breast Cancer Awareness Month program; Salute to Service, held throughout November to support military families and personnel; and PLAY 60, which encourages young NFL fans to be active for at least 60 minutes each day.

Radio and television

Radio coverage is provided by flagship station WRFX and through the Carolina Panthers Radio Network, with affiliates throughout the Carolinas and Virginia. The Panthers' radio broadcasting team is led by play-by-play voice Anish Shroff, with Jake Delhomme as color analyst, and WBT sports director Jim Szoke as studio host. The radio network broadcasts pre-game coverage, games with commentary, and post-game wrap-ups. It also live-broadcasts Panther Talk, a weekly event at Bank of America Stadium which offers fans a chance to meet a player and ask questions of the staff.

National broadcasting and cable television networks cover regular-season games, as well as some preseason games. Locally, Fox affiliate WJZY airs most regular-season games, while home games against an AFC team typically air on CBS affiliate WBTV. Any appearances on Monday Night Football are simulcast on ABC affiliate WSOC-TV, while any appearances on Thursday Night Football are simulcast on WSOC. Sunday night and some Thursday night games are aired on NBC affiliate WCNC-TV.

All preseason games and team specials are televised by the Carolina Panthers Television Network on flagship station WSOC-TV in Charlotte and fourteen affiliate stations throughout the Carolinas, Georgia, Virginia, and Tennessee. WSOC took over as the Panthers' television partner for the 2019 season, replacing longtime television partner WCCB, which had retained this role after losing the Fox affiliation to WJZY in 2013. As of 2021, the preseason television broadcasting team consists of play-by-play commentator Taylor Zarzour, color analyst and former Panthers player Steve Smith, and sideline reporter Kristen Balboni. The network also hosts The Panthers Huddle, a weekly show focusing on the Panthers' upcoming opponent.

The Panthers also offer game broadcasts in Spanish throughout both Carolinas and Mexico, with Jaime Moreno and Toño Ramos providing commentary.

Rivalries

The Panthers have developed heated rivalries with the three fellow members of the NFC South (the Atlanta Falcons, Tampa Bay Buccaneers, and New Orleans Saints). The team's fiercest rivals are the Falcons and Buccaneers.

The two teams have played each other twice a year since the Panthers' inception, and games between the two teams feature large contingents of Panthers fans at Atlanta's Mercedes-Benz Stadium and large contingents of Falcons fans at Bank of America Stadium.

The Panthers' rivalry with Tampa Bay has been described as the most intense in the NFC South. The rivalry originated in 2002 with the formation of the NFC South, but became particularly heated before the 2003 season with verbal bouts between players on the two teams. It escalated further when the Panthers went to Tampa Bay and beat them in what ESPN.com writer Pat Yasinskas described as "one of the most physical contests in recent memory". The rivalry has resulted in a number of severe injuries for players on both teams, some of which were caused by foul play. One of these plays, an illegal hit on Tampa Bay punt returner Clifton Smith, sparked a brief melee between the teams in 2009.

Current staff

Players

Current roster

Hall of Honor
The Carolina Panthers Hall of Honor was established in 1997 to honor individuals for their contributions to the Carolina Panthers organization.

Retired numbers
The Carolina Panthers have retired one number, 51, worn by Sam Mills.

Pro Football Hall of Fame enshrinees
Nominees for the Pro Football Hall of Fame, which "honor[s] individuals who have made outstanding contributions to professional football", are determined by a 46-member selection committee. At least 80% of voters must approve the nominee for him to be inducted.

Ownership and Administration

Jerry Richardson
Jerry Richardson was the founder and first owner of the Carolina Panthers. Richardson and his family owned about 48% of the team, with the remaining 52% owned by a group of 14 limited partners. Richardson and the other investors paid $206 million for the rights to start the team in 1993.

Team President
Mike McCormack, a Hall of Fame lineman for the Cleveland Browns and former coach and executive for the Seattle Seahawks, was the Panthers' first team president, presiding in that role from 1994 until his retirement in 1997; McCormack was inducted as the first person in the Carolina Panthers Hall of Honor later that year. Jerry Richardson's son, Mark, was appointed as the team's second president in 1997 and served in that role until he stepped down in 2009. His brother Jon, who had been president of Bank of America Stadium, stepped down at the same time. The resignations of Mark and Jon Richardson were unexpected, as it was thought that the two would eventually take over the team from their father. Mark Richardson was replaced by Danny Morrison, who had previously served as the athletic director of both Texas Christian University and Wofford College, Richardson's alma mater. Morrison resigned in early 2017. The role was vacant until August 2018, when Tom Glick was hired as team president. He had previously served as the COO of Manchester City.

David Tepper
On May 16, 2018, David Tepper, formerly a minority owner of the Pittsburgh Steelers, finalized an agreement to purchase the Carolina Panthers, for nearly $2.3 billion, a record at the time. The agreement was approved by the league owners on May 22, 2018. According to Forbes, the Panthers are worth approximately $2.3 billion . They ranked the Carolina Panthers as the 21st-most valuable NFL team and the 36th-most valuable sports team in the world.

Coaches
The Carolina Panthers have had six head coaches. Dom Capers was the head coach from 1995 to 1998 and led the team to one playoff appearance. Counting playoff games, he finished with a record of 31–35 (.470). George Seifert coached the team from 1999 to 2001, recording 16 wins and 32 losses (.333). John Fox, the team's longest-tenured head coach, led the team from 2002 to 2010 and coached the team to three playoff appearances including Super Bowl XXXVIII which the Panthers lost. Including playoff games, Fox ended his tenure with a 78–74 (.513) record, making him the first Panthers coach to finish his tenure with the team with a winning record. Ron Rivera held the position from 2011 to 2019 and led the team to four playoff appearances including Super Bowl 50. Counting playoff games, he has a career record of 79–67–1 (.541). Statistically, Rivera holds the highest winning percentage of any Panthers head coach. On December 3, 2019, following a home loss against the Washington Redskins that sent the team's record to 5–7, Rivera was fired by David Tepper. Perry Fewell, then the defensive backs coach for the team, was named interim head coach the same day. On January 7, 2020, Matt Rhule was hired to be the Panthers head coach. Rhule was fired during his third season, with Steve Wilks taking over on an interim basis. Frank Reich was hired head coach on January 26, 2023.

Current staff

Team records

Since they began playing football in 1995, the Panthers have been to four NFC Championship Games; they lost two (1996 and 2005) and won two (2003 and 2015). The Panthers have won six division championships: the NFC West championship in 1996 and the NFC South championship in 2003, 2008, 2013, 2014, and 2015. They have finished as runners-up in their division six times, finishing second-place in the NFC West in 1997 and 1999 and finishing second-place in the NFC South in 2005, 2006, 2007, and 2012. They have qualified for the playoffs 8 times, most recently in 2017.

Kicker John Kasay is the team's career points leader. Kasay scored 1,482 points during his 16 seasons (1995–2010) with the Panthers. Quarterback Cam Newton is the Panthers' career passing leader; he threw for 29,041 yards over his nine seasons with the team (2011–2020). Running back Jonathan Stewart is the career rushing leader for the Carolina Panthers. Stewart, during his tenure with the team (2008–2018), rushed for 6,868 yards with the Panthers. Wide receiver Steve Smith, the team's leading receiver, recorded 12,197 receiving yards during his 13-year (2001–2013) tenure with the team.

See also
Carolina Panthers draft history

References
Notes

Footnotes

External links

 
 Carolina Panthers at the National Football League official website

 
1995 establishments in North Carolina
American football teams in Charlotte, North Carolina
National Football League teams
American football teams established in 1995
Sports teams in Charlotte, North Carolina